Vivienne Balla (born 24 June 1986) is a Hungarian fine art and fashion photographer. She holds a master's degree in photography. The Hungarian fashion and beauty photographer graduated in Moholy-Nagy University of Art and Design, in 2010. Her photos have been published in world-renowned magazines and has received a number of accolades. Balla's specialty is fashion, beauty, advertising and portrait photography. In 2014 she moved to Dubai to start her international career. In the same year she got represented in Tokyo, Milan and Munich.

Schools
2006 - 2011 Visual & Environment Culture teacher (Moholy-Nagy University of Art and Design)
2005 - 2010 Visual Communications - Photography (Moholy-Nagy University of Art and Design)
2003 - 2004 Photography (Camera Anima Open Academy)
2000 - 2005 Tóparti High School of Art

Awards and accolades
 2012: Fashion Awards Hungary, „Fashion Photographer of the Year”
 2014: Fashion Awards Hungary, „Fashion Photographer of the Year” (Nomitated)

Independent exhibitions
2012
 Dreams - (STUDIO V, Budapest Design Week)
2011
 Vivienne's Diary - (FISE Gallery, Budapest)
 Dash of Color (Tripont Gallery, Budapest)
 Marion, (Millenáris Park, Budapest)
 Fashion Moments, (Lánchíd 19 Design Hotel, Budapest)

Group exhibitions
2012
 FISE 30, (Museum of Applied Arts, Budapest)
 Human Dignity, (Ludwig Museum, Budapest)
2011
 Photogenes (Spiritusz Gallery, Budapest)
 Mozgásban (Spiritusz Gallery, Budapest)
2010
 Budapest Art Fair (Kunsthalle, Budapest)
 Art Moments (Hybrid Office Gallery, Budapest)
 MOME Foto 2010 (Eötvös 10 Gallery, Budapest)
 Generation Rules (Hybrid Art & Cafe)
 MOME Diploma 2010 (Ponton Gallery, Budapest)
 Contrasts (FISE Gallery, Budapest)
2009
 Green MOME (Ponton Gallery, Budapest)
 Entrópia (Instant Art Bar Garden, Budapest)
 MOME Maraton (Millenaris Park)
 Ami személyes és ami... (Óbudai Társaskör Gallery, Budapest)
2008
 MOME BESTiárium (Ponton Gallery, Budapest)
 First Sight (Szent István Museum, Budapest)

Magazine publications
Vogue (UK), Harper's Bazaar Arabia, Harper's Bazaar Qatar, Esquire Middle-East, Elle Arab World, Grazia Middle-East, Condé Nast Traveller (Middle-East), VIVA, Mojeh, Indulge (Middle-East), Marie Claire Arabia, Marie Claire Lower Gulf, Marie Claire Hungary, Cosmopolitan, Glamour, InStyle, Shape, Joy, D-journal, Nők Lapja Évszakok, Nők Lapja, Maxima, Éva Magazine, Fashion Issue, Maxima, Fashion Issue, Fotóművészet Magazin, Balkon, Szellemkép, Munkácsi Magazin, Overseas Living (UK), Life Magazin, Where Budapest Magazine, Új Művészet Magazin, PEP! Magazin, Elite Magazin, MOHA Magazin, 2beMAG (ES), Kismet Magazine (US), mashKulture Juicy, HG.hu, Le Cool Budapest, Spottr.hu, Fan the Fire Magazine (UK), Design You Trust, Le Journal Graphic, Looks Like Good Design, Bedroom Genius, Design Corner.

Clients
Giorgio Armani, Louis Vuitton, Chanel, Dior, Burberry, Gucci, Van Cleef & Arpels, Swarovski, Tory Burch, Emporio Armani, Armani Junior, Roger Vivier, Ted Baker, H&M, Nike, Samsung, Honda, Estée Lauder, L'oréal, M.A.C. Cosmetics, Clinique, Bioderma, Nars Cosmetics, Marks & Spencer, Vodafone, bet365, Viva TV, Level Shoe District

References
 Fashion Awards: Fashion Photographer of the Year 2012
 Divány.hu: Női fotósnál nincs annyira jelen a szexualitás (interview)
 Szellemkép folyóirat: Valóság divat - tanulmány az ideálok természetébe (interview) 
 Pixinfo.com: Interjú (interview)
 HotStyle: Fotók A Művészet És A Divat Határán (interview) 
 Kortárs Online: Divatos kételyek - Művészi vagy divatfotó? 
 JOY.hu: Hungarian photographer on the iTunes App Store
 Hir24: Vivienne Balla starts a fashion movement
 Shopping.hu: „Nyitott vagyok mások gondolataira” (interview) 
 HG.hu: Footsteps of a photographer legend
 MashKulture Juicy: Young Hungarian Talents - Vivienne Balla
 HG.hu: Hungarian POP in America (interview)

External links
 Vivienne Balla - Official website

Fashion photographers
Hungarian photographers
1986 births
Living people
Hungarian women photographers